Glenquithle is a steep valley, locality, former feudal barony and thanage, 965 metres south west of Pennan in Aberdeenshire, Scotland.

History
Hugh, Earl of Ross was granted the barony and thanage of Glendowachy by King Robert I of Scotland, which had previously been held by John Comyn, Earl of Buchan.

The location of the caput of the barony is yet to be properly identified.

Notes

References
Groome, Francis H. Ordnance Gazetteer of Scotland (1882-4).

Further reading
Bannerman. Thanage of Glendowachie. Banff, 1897.

Baronies_in_the_Baronage_of_Scotland